The Overland Theater is a historic single-screen movie theater in Overland Park, Kansas that originally opened on December 25, 1946. The theater was designed by Robert O. Boller, with the Boller Brothers architecture firm. The theater's design and architecture is an example of the Moderne-style, incorporating the use of teal neon lights, peach porcelain tiles, glass blocks, and aluminum trim. The theater was purchased by the City of Overland Park in 1988 for historic preservation purposes. The theater reopened in 2000 as the independent Rio Theatre. The theater closed in March 2020 due to COVID-19 and underwent renovations but has not yet reopened.

On February 9, 2005, the theater was placed on the National Register of Historic Places.

References 

Boller Brothers buildings
Cinemas and movie theaters in Kansas
Buildings and structures in Overland Park, Kansas
National Register of Historic Places in Johnson County, Kansas
Theatres completed in 1946
Theatres on the National Register of Historic Places in Kansas